Sun Yee On, or the New Righteousness and Peace Commercial and Industrial Guild, is one of the leading triads in Hong Kong and China. It has more than 25,000 members worldwide.
It is also believed to be active in the UK, the United States, France, and Belgium.

History 
Sun Yee On was founded by Heung Chin, originally from Teochew (Chaozhou), in 1919. Yee On is a historical name for Chaozhou. The organization has been involved in counterfeiting, gambling, narcotics, human trafficking, prostitution, smuggling and extortion. Mainly through ethnic Chinese diaspora, it is thought to extend to the United States, Canada, Thailand, Australia, South Africa and Central America. The founder was deported to Taiwan in the early 1950s and continued to lead the organization from there. Sun Yee On was allegedly taken over by his eldest son Heung Wah-yim, who ostensibly worked as a law clerk. The triad is also noted as being founded by "Teochew and Hokkien immigrants" to Hong Kong.

1980s spill 
In February 1986, a former Hong Kong police officer, Anthony Chung, who had become a member of Sun Yee On, asked the police for protection. He identified Heung Wah-yim as the leader of the triad, and this led to the police arresting eleven members of the Triad on 1 April 1987. Whilst searching Heung Wah-yim's law office, they found a list of 900 numbered names, which appeared to be a membership list of Sun Yee On. In October, Heung Wah-yim was brought to trial, along with five accomplices who all pleaded guilty. Heung Wah-yim professed his innocence throughout the trial, claiming to be the president of a local chapter of the Lions Club and that the list found in his office consisted of potential donors. Chung and another former member were the main prosecution witnesses.  On 20 January 1988, the jury found five of the defendants guilty, including Heung Wah-yim who was sentenced to seven and a half years in prison, acquitting the sixth.

2000s 
The triad operates several vice establishments in Tsim Sha Tsui and Yau Ma Tei, or at least did in November 2010 when a 29-year-old alleged office-bearer or "red pole" of the triad, named "Sai B" Chan, was arrested for vice offences and money laundering.

Lee Tai-lung Lee, a Sun Yee On boss in Tsim Sha Tsui, was murdered in front of the Kowloon Shangri-La hotel on 4 August 2009 by members of the Wo Shing Wo gang. It was supposedly a revenge attack ordered by Leung Kwok-chung, a senior member of a Wo Shing Wo crew in Tai Kok Tsui who was injured by Lee during a bar fight in July 2006 in Prat Avenue. Following Lee's death, three of his former followers stepped in to defend his lucrative entertainment empire from other triads. In 2011(?), Lee's three followers were tracked by "Ko Tat", another "red pole" in Wan Chai, who failed to spread his influence across the harbour. Tai Hau, leader of another Sun Yee On faction active in Tuen Mun, tried to encroach upon Lee's West Kowloon and Tsim Sha Tsui operations. His attempts were thwarted by an undercover police operation, as a result of which 222 people were arrested in January 2012. The Organised Crime and Triad Bureau suspects that "Ko Chun" may be the latest kingpin of Lee's original turf.

On 22 March 2012, police arrested 102 members of Sun Yee On in Shenzhen, China.

In popular culture 
 In the anime adaptation of Black Lagoon, the Thailand branch of Sun Yee On (also known within the anime as Hong Kong Triad, because of the group's place of origin) is based on the fictional city of Roanapur, Thailand and is led by Mr. Chang (a former HKPD cop). In Black Lagoon, the Sun Yee On is considered one of the strongest criminal organizations. 
 The 2012 video game Sleeping Dogs, set in Hong Kong, focuses on the Chinese triads from the perspective of an undercover detective. In Sleeping Dogs, the player plays as Wei Shen, an undercover police officer transferred to the HKPD from San Francisco, on a mission to infiltrate the organised crime lords of the notorious "Sun On Yee".

See also
 Charles Heung and Jimmy Heung are Heung Chin's other sons and involved in activities outside of Sun Yee On.

References

External links
 Triads and organized crime in China

Organized crime groups in China
Organised crime groups in Hong Kong
Triad groups
Gangs in Belgium
Gangs in England
Gangs in France
Gangs in Brazil
Gangs in South Africa
Gangs in Russia
Gangs in Germany
Gangs in the Netherlands
Gangs in Scotland
Organizations established in 1919
Philippine Drug War
Chaozhou
Organized crime groups in Brazil
Gangs in South Korea